Pope Mark V of Alexandria, 98th Pope of Alexandria & Patriarch of the See of St. Mark.

17th-century Coptic Orthodox popes of Alexandria
1619 deaths